Chilodus punctatus, known as the spotted headstander or pearl headstander, is a headstander, a type of fish, in the genus Chilodus. The spotted headstander has a body that extends grayish and green colors over his body and sets off the colors with rows of brown specks.

This fish is named for its distinctive head-down swimming position (at 45°). These fish usually remain in the shade, emerging to feed.

Distribution
Chilodus punctatus is widespread in northeastern South America and in the Loreto region in Peru; up to 7 cm. Typical representative of the Curimatidae, which are among the barbary tetra. The body is moderately elongated, the back slightly raised. The mouth is small, slightly upward, with a thick upper lip. The fish is a headstand, delicate gray to brown, the throat and belly are silver-colored. From the mouth tip over the eye to the middle of the base of the caudal fin an extending black longitudinal band.

Aquarium care
At best they are kept as a group of three or four. These fish are peaceful community fish. The water should be reasonably soft and also slightly acidic. The temperature of the water should be around 26 °C (80 °F). The light should be kept subdued. Provide also places where it can shelter.

The parents should be removed after spawning among the roots of floating plants. The fish will lay around 200 eggs. Fry swim head-down from birth. They can be given brine shrimp as first food.

It eats vegetables, small live foods (like Daphnia), and flake foods.

References

Sources

 
 

Chilodontidae (fish)